The following table shows the European record progression in the men's 200 metres, as ratified by the EAA

Hand timing 

(*) Performance timed over 220 yards

Automatic timing

References 

200 m
200 metres
European 200 metres record